Phospholipase A1 (EC 3.1.1.32; systematic name: phosphatidylcholine 1-acylhydrolase) encoded by the PLA1A gene is a phospholipase enzyme which removes the 1-acyl group: 

phosphatidylcholine + H2O = 2-acylglycerophosphocholine + a carboxylate

It is an enzyme that resides in a class of enzymes called phospholipase that hydrolyze phospholipids into fatty acids.  There are four classes, separated according to the type of reaction they catalyze.  In particular, phospholipase A1 (PLA1) specifically catalyzes the cleavage at the sn-1 position of phospholipids, forming a fatty acid and a lysophospholipid.

Function 

PLA1's are present in numerous species including humans, and have a variety of cellular functions that include regulation and facilitation of the production of lysophospholipid mediators, and acting as digestive enzymes.   These enzymes are responsible for fast turnover rates of cellular phospholipids.  In addition to this, the products of the reaction catalyzed by PLA1 which are a fatty acid and a lysophospholipid are important in various biological functions such as platelet aggregation and smooth muscle contraction.  In addition, lysophospholipids can be found as surfactants in food techniques and cosmetics, and can be used in drug delivery.  Since PLA1 is found in many species, it has been found that there are different classes of this one specific enzyme based on the organism being studied.

Species and tissue distribution 

There are many variations of PLA1, differing slightly between each organism it is present in.  Most notably, it can be found in mammalian cells such as plasma of rat livers and bovine brains, and can also be found in metazoan parasites, protozoan parasites, and snake venom.

Substrate specificity  

PLA1 hydrolyzes nonionic substrates preferentially over ionic substrates.  Optimum pH conditions for PLA1 activity on neutral phospholipids is around 7.5, whereas the optimal conditions for PLA1 activity on acidic phospholipids is around 4.

Structure 

The structure of a PLA1 is a monomer that contains the following sequence: Gly-X-Ser-X-Gly, where X represents any other amino acid.  The serine is considered the active site in the enzyme.  PLA1's also contain a catalytic triad of Ser-Asp-His, with a variety of cysteine residues needed for disulfide bond formation.  The cysteine residues are responsible for key structural motifs such as the lid domain and the B9 domain, both of which are lipid binding surface loops.  These two loops can vary between each PLA1.  For example, a PLA1 enzyme with a long lid domain (22-23 amino acids) and a long B9 domain (18-19 amino acids) constitute an extracellular PLA1 exhibiting triacylglycerol hydrolase activity.  In contrast, a PLA1 enzyme that is considered more selective will have a short lid and B9 domain that span 7-12 and 12-13 amino acids, respectively.

Industrial use 

Unlike other phospholipases such as PLA2, there is much that is unknown about PLA1 due to the lack of any efficient way to purify, clone, express, and characterize this enzyme.  PLA1 is currently commercially unavailable because of this.  Lysophospholipids can be found as surfactants in food techniques and cosmetics, and can be used in drug delivery.  Current research is being applied to determine suitable growth environments for PLA1 production.  In one particular study, it was found that PLA1 can be produced by S. cerevisiae and A. oryzae.  In these PLA1 producing cultures, increasing the nitrogen and carbon sources can lead to increase in PLA1 yields.

Discovery 

In the early 1900s, an observation was made, showing an accumulation of free fatty acids after incubation of pancreatic juice with phosphatidylcholine.  One of the first cases of observed PLA1 activity was on 1903 when snake venom was found to alter phosphatidylcholine into lysophosphatidylcholine, which is defined as a phosphatidylcholine without one of its fatty acids.  In the 1960s, it was discovered to be that enzymes catalyze this fatty acid cleavage in multiple ways, one of which is the sn-1 position.  This particular reaction is catalyzed by PLA1, while the reaction at the sn-2 position is catalyzed by phospholipase A2.

See also
 Outer membrane phospholipase A1

References 

Peripheral membrane proteins
EC 3.1.1